TZN Xenna was one of the early Polish punk rock bands.

Members

1981 - 1983
Krzysztof Chojnacki Zygzak (vocals)
Marek Kucharski Marcus (guitar)
Jacek Zientała Sidney (bass)
Tomasz Kożuchowski Gogo Szulc (drums)

1983 - 1987
Krzysztof Chojnacki Zygzak (vocals)
Marek Kucharski (guitar)
Andrzej Kuszpryt (bass)
Dynia (drums)

History
TZN Xenna was founded in August 1981 in Warsaw by Zygzak, Gogo Szulc and Piotr Dubiel. The first name was Kamash and the Eckers. According to Marek, the name translated into English would be "That Means Xenna" (tzn translating as "that means" and xenna being just a word with no meaning, like a name).

Their first concert group had on September 11, 1981 in "Skarpa" club. In the same month band took part in new wave Festival in Toruń, but without success.

Polish punk rock groups